Johann van Zyl (born 2 February 1991) is a South African former racing cyclist, who rode professionally between 2013 and 2020 for ,  and . He rode at the 2013 UCI Road World Championships, and was named in the start list for the 2015 Vuelta a España and the 2016 Giro d'Italia.

After retiring from professional cycling, van Zyl became a coach with Catalyst Coaching.

Major results
2008
 1st  Road race, National Junior Road Championships
2009
 1st  Time trial, National Junior Road Championships
 1st Stage 1 Vuelta al Besaya
2010
 1st  Road race, National Under-23 Road Championships
2011
 National Road Championships
4th Road race
6th Time trial
 8th Chrono des Nations U23
2013
 1st Stage 4 Tour of Rwanda
 1st Stage 5 (TTT) Tour de Korea
 6th Chrono des Nations U23
2015
 1st Stage 5 Tour of Austria
2016
 6th Time trial, National Road Championships

Grand Tour general classification results timeline

References

External links

1991 births
Living people
South African male cyclists
Sportspeople from Cape Town
White South African people